The  was a part of the French legislature during the French Revolution and beyond. It is also the generic French term used to refer to any legislative body.

History
The Constitution of the Year I foresaw the need for a corps législatif. During the period of the French Directory, beginning in 1795, the Corps législatif referred to the bicameral legislature of the Conseil des Cinq-Cents (Council of Five Hundred) and the Conseil des Anciens (Council of Ancients).

Later, under Napoleon's Consulate, the Constitution of the Year VIII (1799) set up a Corps législatif as the law-making body of the three-part government apparatus (alongside the Tribunat and the Sénat conservateur). This body replaced the Conseil des Cinq-Cents, established by the Constitution of the Year III of the Directory period as the lower house of the French legislature, but its role consisted solely of voting on laws deliberated before the Tribunat. The Constitution of the Year X continued the corps' existence, but Napoleon grew more impatient with its slow deliberations and stripped it of much of its power in 1804. It was finally abolished by Louis XVIII on 4 June 1814, to be replaced by the Chambre des députés (though a Chambre des représentants was briefly set up during the Hundred Days).

When Napoleon III gained power, he re-constituted the Corps as France's lower chamber through the Constitution of 1852, with members elected by direct universal suffrage for terms of 6 years. The elections occurred in February 1852, June 1857, 31 May 1863 and May 1869. Faced with an omnipotent executive – ministers appointed by Napoleon III were only dependent on him – the elected corps législatif of the Second Empire shared its reduced legislative powers with the executive Conseil d'État, made up of functionaries, and the Sénat, whose members were named for life.

The name was finally changed to Chamber of Deputies by the Third Republic.

See also
A corps législatif also existed in the Republic of Frankfurt.

External links

1795 establishments in France
1814 disestablishments in France
Defunct lower houses
1795 events of the French Revolution
1796 events of the French Revolution
1797 events of the French Revolution
1798 events of the French Revolution
1799 events of the French Revolution
1800s in France
First French Empire
French Consulate
Historical legislatures in France